Leitsch is a surname. Notable people with the surname include:

Dick Leitsch (1935–2018), American activist
Maxim Leitsch (born 1998), German footballer

German-language surnames